Antoine Benoist (born 6 August 1999) is a French former road and cyclo-cross cyclist. He retired in June 2022 due to health issues.

Major results

2016–2017
 1st Overall Junior Coupe de France
1st Bagnoles-de-l'Orne
 2nd Overall UCI Junior World Cup
1st Rome
2nd Cauberg
2nd Namur
 2nd National Junior Championships
 Junior Brico Cross
2nd Kruibeke
2018–2019
 1st  National Under-23 Championships
 1st Overall Under-23 Coupe de France
1st Pierric
1st Flamanville
 3rd  UCI World Under-23 Championships
 3rd  UEC European Under-23 Championships
 3rd Overall UCI Under-23 World Cup
2nd Koksijde
2nd Pontchâteau
2nd Hoogerheide
3rd Bern
3rd Tábor
 Under-23 DVV Trophy
3rd Antwerpen
2019–2020
 1st  National Under-23 Championships
 1st Illnau
 Under-23 DVV Trophy
1st Baal
2nd Brussels
2nd Lille
 Under-23 Coupe de France
1st La Mézière
 3rd  UEC European Under-23 Championships
 3rd Overall UCI Under-23 World Cup
2nd Heusden-Zolder
2nd Hoogerheide
3rd Tábor
2020–2021
 Toi Toi Cup
3rd Holé Vrchy

References

External links

1999 births
Living people
French male cyclists
Cyclo-cross cyclists
21st-century French people